Mirchi ka salan, or curried chilli peppers, is a popular Indian chilli and peanut curry from Hyderabad, Telangana, India, that usually accompanies Hyderabadi biryani alongside dahi chutney. The dish contains green chilli peppers, peanuts, sesame seeds, dry coconut, cumin seeds, ginger and garlic paste,  turmeric powder, bay leaf, and thick tamarind juice.

Mirchi ka salan is a traditional Hyderabadi dish prepared for weddings and special occasions. It is a spicy dish served with rice (either plain or spiced, like biryani rice) or chapati. The mirchi (chilli peppers) are cooked in spices and mixed with a ground peanut paste which gives the dish a grainy texture. Sometimes the chillies can also be substituted with tomatoes (tamatey in Urdu) and eggplant (baigan in Urdu), which then becomes tamatey ka salan and baigan ka salan respectively.

See also
 Hyderabadi cuisine
 List of condiments
 List of peanut dishes

References

Indian condiments
Indian curries
Telangana cuisine
Hyderabadi cuisine
Muhajir cuisine
Peanut dishes